In baseball statistics, games pitched (denoted by Games G in tables of only pitching statistics) is the number of games in which a player appears as a pitcher; a player who is announced as the pitcher must face at least one batter, although exceptions are made if the pitcher announced in the starting lineup is injured before facing a batter, perhaps while batting or running the bases in the top of the first inning, before the opposing team comes to bat. The statistic is also referred to as appearances, usually to refer to the number of games a relief pitcher has pitched in.

Career leaders

1,000-games-pitched club 

Listed are all Major League Baseball players with at least 1000 games pitched. LaTroy Hawkins is the most recent player to reach the 1,000 games mark.

Stats updated through the 2015 season

See also
Games started
Games finished

References

Pitching statistics